Piliostigma thonningii is a species of flowering plants in the legume family, Fabaceae. It belongs to the subfamily Cercidoideae.  Common names of this tree include camel's foot tree, monkey bread, monkey biscuit tree, "Rhodesian Bauhinia" or "wild bauhinia" (previously placed in that genus).

Description

Piliostigma thonningii grows quickly relative to some other tree species it competes with, and relies on rapid re-growth to survive bush fires.  It grows in African wooded grassland or woodland.

The flower petals are white and the thick, calyces (or seed pods) are covered in rust coloured hairs. The pods do not spilt (like other tree pods) but fall from the branches, then rot whilst on the ground, releasing the seeds.

The inner bark of the tree has been used to make rope.

References

Other sources

External links
 Species reference at AgroForestryTree Database.
 FAO description
 PlantZAfrica.com
 Images on iSpot

Cercidoideae